Bassam Al-Soukaria (May 14, 1580 – April 13, 1667) was a Lebanese army commander-in-chief, son of Prince Nazim el Maany from the Maan Druze dynasty. Bassam Al-Soukaria is considered one of the most powerful army commanders to rule Mount Lebanon army in the seventeenth century.

1580 births
1667 deaths
People from the Ottoman Empire